Pectinimura montiatilis is a moth in the family Lecithoceridae. It is found in Palawan province of the Philippines.

The wingspan is 15–16 mm. The forewings are mustard brown, sparsely speckled with dark fuscous scales throughout. The hindwings are greyish brown.

Etymology
The species name is derived from Latin montanus (meaning mountain).

References

Moths described in 2008
montiatilis